Stone Castle is a castle at Stone, near Bluewater in Kent, England. It was built between 1135 and 1140 on the site where William the Conqueror signed a treaty with the men of Kent in 1067.

History
It was owned by the Wiltshire family, which included Bridget Wingfield, a close friend of Anne Boleyn, whose correspondence was used to help condemn the queen for adultery. In 1527, it was visited by Thomas Wolsey, Thomas More and the Earl of Derby. This was around the time Henry was first battling to marry Anne Boleyn, who lived at Hever Castle twenty miles away.

During World War II, the RAF occupied the castle. It is now owned by Blue Circle, and the land was leased to Land Securities in 2000. It is now occupied by a Private Ambulance Company, Savoy Ventures.

References

External links
 www.heritagegateway.org.uk - Listed building information with details of the "new" house of c1825

Castles in Kent
Exhibition and conference centres in England
Grade II listed buildings in Kent